KFC Cycling Team is an Indonesian UCI Continental cycling team established in 2016, gaining UCI Continental status in 2017.

Team roster

Major wins
2017
Stage 2 Tour de Flores, Muhammah Imam Arifin
Stage 4 Tour de Singkarak, Jamal Hibatulah
Stages 6 & 7 Tour de Singkarak, Muhammah Imam Arifin
2018
Stage 2 Tour de Indonesia, Abdul Gani
2019
Stage 4 Tour de Siak, Muhamad Nur Fathoni

References

External links

UCI Continental Teams (Asia)
Cycling teams established in 2016
Cycling teams based in Indonesia
2016 establishments in Indonesia